The 1907 Yorkshire Cup was the third occasion on which the Yorkshire Cup competition was held. This year's final was a repeat of the first Yorkshire Cup final in which the same two clubs reached the same outcome. 
Hunslet won the trophy for the  second time in three years by beating Halifax by the score of 17–0

The match was played at Headingley, Leeds, now in West Yorkshire. The attendance was 15,000 and receipts were £397

Background 

This season there were no junior/amateur clubs taking part, Pontefract folded part way through the last season, and last years cup winner and cup holder, Bradford, became turncoats to play with the round ball. As replacement, a new club Bradford Northern joined the league, resulting in an overall decrease of two from 1906, and giving a total of thirteen entrants.

This in turn resulted in three byes in the first round.

Competition and results

Round 1 
Involved  5 matches (with three byes) and 13 clubs

Round 2 – quarterfinals 
Involved 4 matches and 8 clubs

Round 2 – Replays  
Involved  1 match and 2 clubs

Round 3 – semifinals  
Involved 2 matches and 4 clubs

Final

Teams and scorers 

Scoring – Try = three (3) points – Goal = two (2) points – Drop goal = two (2) points

The road to success

Notes and comments 
1 * 1 * First Yorkshire Cup match played by newly formed club Bradford Northern who replaced Bradford who had converted to Soccer

2 * Headingley, Leeds, is the home ground of Leeds RLFC with a capacity of 21,000. The record attendance was  40,175 for a league match between Leeds and Bradford Northern on 21 May 1947.

General information for those unfamiliar 
The Rugby League Yorkshire Cup competition was a knock-out competition between (mainly professional) rugby league clubs from  the  county of Yorkshire. The actual area was at times increased to encompass other teams from  outside the  county such as Newcastle, Mansfield, Coventry, and even London (in the form of Acton & Willesden.

The Rugby League season always (until the onset of "Summer Rugby" in 1996) ran from around August-time through to around May-time and this competition always took place early in the season, in the Autumn, with the final taking place in (or just before) December (The only exception to this was when disruption of the fixture list was caused during, and immediately after, the two World Wars)

See also 
1907–08 Northern Rugby Football Union season
Rugby league county cups

References

External links
Saints Heritage Society
1896–97 Northern Rugby Football Union season at wigan.rlfans.com
Hull&Proud Fixtures & Results 1896/1897
Widnes Vikings – One team, one passion Season In Review – 1896–97
The Northern Union at warringtonwolves.org

RFL Yorkshire Cup
Yorkshire Cup